The Little Falls Meetinghouse is a historic Friends meeting house located at Fallston, Harford County, Maryland, United States. It was constructed in 1843 and is a sprawling one-story fieldstone structure with shallow-pitched gable roof and a shed-roofed porch. The building replaced an earlier meetinghouse built in 1773. Also on the property is a cemetery and a one-story frame mid-19th century school building, with additions made post-1898 and in 1975. It features the characteristic two entrance doors and a sliding partition dividing the interior into the men's and women's sides. The Friends currently meet on the former men's side of the meetinghouse, and the women's side is only used for large groups and special occasions.

The Little Falls Meetinghouse was listed on the National Register of Historic Places in 1980.

Notable people
 Elisha Tyson, devoted emancipator and abolitionist
 Martha Ellicott Tyson, Quaker elder, author and co-founder of Swarthmore College

References

External links
, including photo from 1977, at Maryland Historical Trust

Quaker meeting houses in Maryland
Churches in Harford County, Maryland
Churches on the National Register of Historic Places in Maryland
Churches completed in 1843
19th-century Quaker meeting houses
Historic American Buildings Survey in Maryland
1843 establishments in Maryland
National Register of Historic Places in Harford County, Maryland